Roksana Pindor (born 1 August 1994 in Żyrardów), better known by her stage name Saszan, is a Polish singer. At the Young Stars Festival in 2015 Saszan won the "Best Artist" award. That same year she participated in the Polish TV show Celebrity Splash! where she placed second. In 2016 she signed a record deal with Universal Music Polska. Her debut album RSP peaked at number 2 in the Polish album chart.

She participated in the Polish national final for the Eurovision Song Contest 2018 with a song "Nie chcę ciebie mniej", where she came sixth.

At the beginning of 2020 she announced that she would come back and take part in the Polish national selections for the Eurovision Song Contest 2020 called "Szansa na sukces", but failed to qualify to the final.

Discography

Studio albums

Singles

References

Living people
1994 births
Polish singers
21st-century Polish singers